Birgit Ente (born 27 July 1988, in Alkmaar) is a Dutch judoka who competes in the women's 48 kg category. At the 2012 Summer Olympics, she was defeated in the second round.

References

External links
 
 
 

1988 births
Living people
Dutch female judoka
Olympic judoka of the Netherlands
Judoka at the 2012 Summer Olympics
Sportspeople from Alkmaar
European Games competitors for the Netherlands
Judoka at the 2015 European Games
21st-century Dutch women